Thuravoor Thekku is a village in Alappuzha district in the Indian state of Kerala. Thuravoor lies between the towns of Alappuzha and Kochi along the NH 47.

Administration
Thuravoor  panchayat falls under the Aroor Assembly constituency and the Alappuzha Parliamentary constituency.

Demographics
 India census, Thuravoor Thekku had a population of 27838 with 13417 males and 14421 females.

References

Villages in Alappuzha district
Suburbs of Kochi